Julie Anita Vanloo (born 10 February 1993) is a Belgian basketball player for Casademont Zaragoza of La Liga Feminina. She also plays for the Belgian national team and participated at EuroBasket Women 2017 and the 2020 Summer Olympics.

References

External links
 Julie Vanloo at Eurobasket.com
 
 
 

1993 births
Living people
Belgian women's basketball players
Olympic basketball players of Belgium
Basketball players at the 2020 Summer Olympics
Point guards
Sportspeople from Ostend